King's crown is a common name for several plants and may refer to:

Calotropis procera

Justicia carnea
Rhodiola integrifolia
Rhodiola rosea